The following are most of the different possible methods of treating and disposing of nuclear waste:

Storage
Deep geological repository
Dry cask storage
Ducrete
Ocean floor disposal
Saltcrete
Spent fuel pool
Spent nuclear fuel shipping cask (transportation)
Synroc
Waste Isolation Pilot Plant
Deep borehole disposal
Vitrification / Geomelting
Treatment
Nuclear transmutation
Nuclear reprocessing
PUREX

See also

Nuclear power
High-level radioactive waste management

Treatment technologies
Waste treatment technology
Waste treatment technologies
Waste-related lists